This is a list of notable restaurant chains in Poland. A restaurant chain is a set of related restaurants with the same name in many different locations that are either under shared corporate ownership (e.g., McDonald's in the U.S.) or franchising agreements. Typically, the restaurants within a chain are built to a standard format through architectural prototype development and offer a standard menu and/or services.

Major restaurant chains in Poland

See also
List of supermarket chains in Poland

References

Restaurants in Poland
Restaurant chains
Poland